The Yoshida Doctrine was a strategy adopted by Japan after its defeat in 1945 under Prime Minister Shigeru Yoshida, the prime minister 1948–1954. He concentrated upon reconstructing Japan's domestic economy while  relying heavily on the security alliance with the United States. The Yoshida Doctrine emerged in 1951 and it shaped Japanese foreign policy into the 21st century.  First, Japan is firmly allied with the United States in the Cold War against Communism. Second,  Japan relies on American military strength and limits its own defense forces to a minimum. Third, Japan emphasizes economic diplomacy in its world affairs.  The  economic dimension was fostered by Hayato Ikeda who served as Yoshida's finance minister and later was prime minister. The Yoshida doctrine was accepted by the United States; the actual term was coined in 1977.  Most historians argue the policy was wise and successful, but a minority criticize it as naïve  and inappropriate.

Historical background
Even after its surrender in World War II, the Japanese government continued to function. It held its first post-war election in the spring of 1946. This election was also the first time women were allowed to vote in Japan. Yoshida Shigeru emerged as the winner of the election, becoming Prime Minister. Around the same time, discontent grew over the previous Meiji Constitution, and a desire for an entirely new constitution grew. A small team from a section of SCAP helped draft a new constitution. After some revisions, the Japanese Diet approved this new Constitution in November 1946, it took effect in May 1947, and it continues on today. One important aspect of the Constitution was Article 9 which stated that "the Japanese people forever renounce war as a sovereign right of the nation" and that military forces "will never be maintained". When Yoshida Shigeru made his policies (the Yoshida Doctrine) Article 9 played a large role.

Core elements

Reliance on the United States
The Yoshida doctrine and Japan's foreign policy of the time, emphasized mutual relations with the United States. Japan relied on the United States’ military for security, because of Article 9 of the Japanese Constitution, being denied the right to war-making potential. Repeated attempts by the United States, in following years, to get Japan to increase its military expenditure were rejected by Prime Minister Yoshida on the basis of Japan's pacifist post-war constitution. Military was not the only thing Japan relied on the United States for. During the Cold War, Japan's largest trading partner was the United States. Exports to the United States at the time played a large role in Japan's economic development.

Economic emphasis
Prime Minister Yoshida's aim was to focus all available means on an economic recovery. Given the lack of military power, Japanese foreign policy naturally placed emphasis on economic policy. Yoshida envisioned a speedy economic recovery through which Japan would be able to once again become a major world power (at which point Japan would be in a position to rearm). His policy was thus not rooted in pacifism but was in line with the realist foreign policy that's been a dominating force in Japan's approach to international relations since the Meiji Restoration. Yoshida and finance minister Hayato Ikeda took leadership roles as Japan began to rebuild its industrial infrastructure and placed a premium on unrestrained economic growth. Many of these concepts still impact Japan's political and economic policies.

See also
 Foreign policy doctrine
 Fukuda Doctrine
 Treaty of Mutual Cooperation and Security between the United States and Japan

Notes

Further reading
 Chai, Sun-Ki. "Entrenching the Yoshida defense doctrine: Three techniques for institutionalization." International Organization (1997): 389-412 online.
 Dower, John W. Empire and Aftermath: Yoshida Shigeru and the Japanese Experience, 1878-1954 (1988).
 Edström, Bert. "The International Cold Warrior: Ikeda Hayato." in Edström, Japan’s Evolving Foreign Policy Doctrine (Palgrave Macmillan, London, 1999) pp. 46-56.

 Iokibe, Makoto, and Takuya Sasaki. "The 1960s: Japan’s Economic Rise and the Maturing of the Partnership." in The History of U.S.-Japan Relations (Palgrave Macmillan, Singapore, 2017) pp. 149-169.
 Rodan, Garry, Hewison, Kevin and Robison, Richard. (1997). The Political Economy of South-East Asia: An Introduction. Melbourne: Oxford University Press. ; 
 Masuda, Hajimu. "Fear of World War III: Social Politics of Japan’s Rearmament and Peace Movements, 1950–1953." Journal of Contemporary History (July 2012), vol. 47, no. 3, 551-571. http://jch.sagepub.com/content/47/3/551.short
 Sugita, Yoneyuki. "The Yoshida Doctrine as a myth." Japanese Journal of American Studies 27 (2016): 123-143 online.

Cold War history of Japan
Foreign relations of Post-war Japan
Foreign policy doctrines
Japanese foreign policy